Henry William Moorcroft Hearsey  OBE was archdeacon of the Riviera from 1972 to 1976.

Hearsey was educated at Pembroke College, Oxford and ordained in 1935. After curacies in West Southbourne and Bournemouth he was a Chaplain to the Forces from 1940 to 1949:  he was mentioned in despatches in 1945. After that he served in Vienna, Gibraltar, Nice and Cannes.

Notes

Archdeacons of the Riviera
20th-century English Anglican priests
Alumni of Pembroke College, Oxford
Officers of the Order of the British Empire
Royal Army Chaplains' Department officers